The 1910 New York Highlanders season saw the team finishing with a total of 88 wins and 63 losses, coming in second in the American League.

New York was managed by George Stallings and Hal Chase. Their home games were played at Hilltop Park. The alternate and equally unofficial nickname, "Yankees", was being used more and more frequently by the media.

Regular season 
 August 30, 1910: Tom Hughes threw nine no-hit innings against the Cleveland Naps, but the game was tied 0–0, so the game went to extra innings. Hughes gave up a hit with one out in the tenth, then wound up giving up five runs in the eleventh to lose the game, 5–0. The franchise would wait another seven years for their first official no-hitter.

Season standings

Record vs. opponents

Notable transactions 
 May 26, 1910: Red Kleinow was purchased from the Highlanders by the Boston Red Sox.
 August 5, 1910: Johnny Priest was purchased by the Highlanders from the Danville Red Sox.

Roster

Player stats

Batting

Starters by position 
Note: Pos = Position; G = Games played; AB = At bats; H = Hits; Avg. = Batting average; HR = Home runs; RBI = Runs batted in

Other batters 
Note: G = Games played; AB = At bats; H = Hits; Avg. = Batting average; HR = Home runs; RBI = Runs batted in

Pitching

Starting pitchers 
Note: G = Games pitched; IP = Innings pitched; W = Wins; L = Losses; ERA = Earned run average; SO = Strikeouts

Other pitchers 
Note: G = Games pitched; IP = Innings pitched; W = Wins; L = Losses; ERA = Earned run average; SO = Strikeouts

Notes

References 
1910 New York Highlanders team page at www.baseball-almanac.com
 1910 New York Highlanders page at Baseball Reference

New York Yankees seasons
New York Highlanders
New York Highlanders
1910s in Manhattan
Washington Heights, Manhattan